Carlos Mauricio Tapia Pavez (born 18 September 1977) was a Chilean footballer. 

He is remembered for his spells at Unión Española and Deportes La Serena.

Honours

Club
Unión Española
 Primera B (1): 1999
 Primera División de Chile (1): 2005 Apertura

External links
 Profile at BDFA 
 

1977 births
Living people
Chilean footballers
Unión Española footballers
Deportes La Serena footballers
Everton de Viña del Mar footballers
Club Deportivo Universidad Católica footballers
A.C. Barnechea footballers
Chilean Primera División players
Primera B de Chile players
Association football central defenders